The County of Kintore is one of the 49 counties of South Australia. Located on the state's west coast, it was proclaimed in 1890 and named for the Governor Algernon Keith-Falconer.

Hundreds 
The County of Kintore contains the following 8 hundreds, covering approximately the southern half of its total area:
 From west to east in the modern locality of Bookabie: Nash, Magarey, Giles
 From northwest to southeast in the modern locality of Penong: Cohen, Burgoyne, Bagster, Kevin, Keith

See also
 Lands administrative divisions of South Australia

References

Kintore